On 4 March 2015, at around 05:20 local time, there was a mining accident at the Zasyadko coal mine in rebel-held Eastern Ukraine. It is suspected to have been caused by a gas explosion.

Twenty-three people were confirmed dead. Local rebels claimed a death toll of 30. There were 230 people in the mine at the time of the explosion. The Speaker of the Ukrainian parliament, Volodymyr Groysman, called for a minute's silence for 32 fatalities, but later retracted that figure to say that one had died and 30 others' status was unknown.

Ukrainian President Petro Poroshenko called for police and rescue services to have access to the mine.

See also
 2007 Zasyadko mine disaster

References

External links
 

Explosions in 2015
2015 mining disasters
2015 in Ukraine
Gas explosions
Coal mining disasters in Ukraine
Explosions in Ukraine
History of Donetsk
March 2015 events in Europe
2011 disasters in Ukraine